William A. Lord (August 28, 1849 – August 21, 1927) was a Vermont lawyer and politician who served as Speaker of the Vermont House of Representatives.

Biography
William Adams Lord was born in Montpelier, Vermont, on August 28, 1849. He graduated from Dartmouth College in 1869, studied law and became an attorney in Montpelier.

A Republican, Lord served in several local offices and on the staff of the Vermont Senate. In 1896 Lord was Chairman of the Vermont Republican Convention. Lord served three terms in the Vermont House of Representatives in the 1890s, and was Speaker from 1896 to 1898.  Lord resigned as Speaker to accept appointment as a federal bank examiner and Commissioner of the United States Circuit Court.

In 1904 Lord was elected to the Vermont Senate. From 1904 to 1906 Lord was Chairman of the commission that revised Vermont's statutes, and from 1906 to 1908 he was head of the board of editors that published the revised work.

Lord died in Montpelier on August 21, 1927.

Personal
William Adams Lord was the grandson of Nathan Lord, the longtime President of Dartmouth College.

References 

1849 births
1927 deaths
People from Montpelier, Vermont
Dartmouth College alumni
Vermont lawyers
Speakers of the Vermont House of Representatives
Republican Party members of the Vermont House of Representatives
Republican Party Vermont state senators
19th-century American lawyers